This is the list of cathedrals in Turkey sorted by denomination.

Eastern Orthodox
Church of St. George, Istanbul (Ecumenical Patriarchate of Constantinople)

Oriental Orthodox
Surp Asdvadzadzin Patriarchal Church (Holy Mother of God Patriarchal Church), Istanbul (Armenian Patriarchate of Constantinople)

Catholic 
Cathedrals of the Catholic Church in Turkey:
 Cathedral of the Annunciation, İskenderun (Latin Rite)
 Cathedral of the Holy Spirit, Istanbul (Latin Rite)
 Armenian Cathedral of St. Mary, Istanbul (Armenian Rite)
 St. John's Cathedral (Izmir) (Latin Rite)
 Co-Cathedral of St. Anthony of Padua, Mersin (Latin Rite)
 Melkite Greek Catholic Cathedral, Istanbul (Melkite Greek Catholic Rite)
 St. Mary's Cathedral, Diyarbakır (Chaldean Rite)

See also

List of cathedrals

References

!
Cathedrals
Cathedrals
Turkey